Something Real is the seventh studio album by the American musician Phoebe Snow, released in 1989 by Elektra Records. It was her first album in eight years. While caring for her disabled daughter, Snow spent five years making demo tapes, and mailing them to labels.

The album peaked at No. 75 on the Billboard 200.

Background
According to veteran recorded music maven Charles Koppelman, who had headed Columbia Records music publishing department at the time Snow was on the Columbia roster, his interest in Snow was captured after he recognized hers as the voice singing the jingle for a Bloomingdale's television commercial. Koppelman resultantly attended Snow's Bottom Line gig in July 1986 and - deeming her performance a "knockout" - he began to champion Snow's return to recording, the singer's last album release: Rock Away, having been issued in 1981. With Koppelman's support Snow was signed to Elektra Records by the year's end:

Production
The album was produced by Rob Fraboni and Ricky Fataar; Russ Titelman also worked on the album. Mick Taylor played guitar on "Cardiac Arrest". Lou Marini and Tom Scott led the horn section.

Snow shot a video, her first, for the album's first single, "If I Can Just Get Through the Night". The track "Something Real" which served as second single - also being afforded a video - was hailed by WAPO music critic Joe Brown would describe the title cut of Something Real as "'Poetry Man' revisited...[The earlier] song's ingenuously adulterous protagonist has wised up in a decade. This time around, she wants" - quoting the lyrics of "Something Real" - something real - something I don't have to steal. However Snow would state her vision for the song was "not [as] a vulnerable fragile song...I thought it could be a more powerful R&B ballad like something Whitney Houston might sing But everybody who heard my homemade demo thought [that acoustic version] was too good to change."

Critical reception

The Los Angeles Times thought that "while this album is classy and polished, there isn't much that approaches classic Snow territory, aside from 'We Might Never Feel This Way Again', with its touching, grab-the-moment romanticism, and the softly tender 'I'm Your Girl', which Snow wrote for her late mother." The Buffalo News wrote that the singer "still has trouble resisting instrumental sucrose in the background, but the sound of Phoebe Snow singing 'I'm Your Girl' or 'If I Can Just Get Through the Night' is the essence of pop authenticity." The Boston Globe concluded that Something Real "has a couple of slick, poorly chosen cover songs, but her four original songs on the album are sparkling."

The Vancouver Sun opined that "the highly produced musical packaging feels too slick and hip for conveying truly honest emotions." The Washington Post declared: "With a voice that's equally suited to pop, R&B and gospel, she has no difficulty reviving the old Emotions' hit 'Best of My Love' or emulating James Taylor's tuneful insouciance on 'Soothin', but other song choices don't pan out nearly as well." The New York Times deemed Something Real Snow's "most coherent album," writing that her "excesses are reined in just enough to make her sound bighearted and benevolent rather than overwrought."

AllMusic called the album "a sturdy, respectable set," writing that Snow "tends to de-emphasize the more unusual aspects of her voice, although not so much that you'd confuse it with anybody else's."

Aftermath
At the time of the album's release, Snow would say of Something Real: “We’ve made our statement on this record: it's got the right amount of everything. But I want my next [album] to reduce the margin for error - [to have] strong powerful music...that expresses how I envision myself." Snow would in fact abandon the recording of her second Elektra Records album after cutting six tracks which (Phoebe Snow quote:) "were just wrong. They weren't who I am. I was like the gal singer who phoned her part in." Snow asked for release from her Elektra Records contract, recording what would be her final two studio albums: I Can't Complain (1998) and Natural Wonder (2003), for indie labels.

Track listing

Personnel 
 Phoebe Snow – vocals, acoustic guitar (1, 3), backing vocals (2, 8), harmony vocals (2, 6, 10)

Session players/ singers

 Robbie Kondor – keyboards (1, 6, 8), synth string arrangements (2)
 Joy Askew – keyboards (2, 6, 7, 8), acoustic piano (2)
 Jeff Bova – keyboards (3, 5)
 Robbie Kilgore – keyboards (3, 5)
 Rob Mounsey – keyboards (3, 5)
 Eric Rehl – keyboards (4), drums (4)
 Ivan Neville – keyboards (8), acoustic piano (10), Hammond B3 organ (10)
 David Frank – keyboards (9), arrangements (9)
 Pat Thrall – guitars (2, 6, 7, 8)
 John McCurry – guitars (4)
 Mick Taylor – guitars (5, 7, 10)
 Larry DeBari – guitars (6)
 Shane Fontayne – guitars (10)
 Ricky Fataar – bass (1), percussion (1, 2, 7, 10), drums (2, 5-8, 10), additional drums (3), acoustic guitar (7), guitars (8), backing vocals (8)
 Anthony Jackson – bass (2, 6, 7, 8)
 Jimmy Bralower – drum machine programming (3, 5)
 Errol "Crusher" Bennett – percussion (8)
 Carol Steele – percussion (9)
 Paul McGovern – saxophone (2)
 Tom Scott – alto saxophone (9)
 Lou Marini – saxophones (9)
 Bob Mintzer – saxophones (9)
 Dave Bargeron – trombone (9)
 Randy Brecker – trumpet (9)
 Jon Faddis – trumpet (9)
 Darryl Johnson – backing vocals (6, 7, 10), bass (10)

Session players/ singers (cont.) 

 Blondie Chaplin – backing vocals (8)
 Lani Groves – backing vocals (9)
 Brenda King – backing vocals (9)
 Vaneese Thomas – backing vocals (9)

Production
 Don Rubin – executive producer 
 Hank Medress – associate executive producer 
 Phoebe Snow – pre-production 
 Ricky Fataar – producer (1, 2, 6, 7, 8, 10)
 Rob Fraboni – producer (1, 2, 6, 7, 8, 10)
 Russ Titelman – producer (3, 5, 9)
 Phil Ramone – producer (4)
 Steve Boyer – recording (1, 2, 6, 7, 8, 10), mixing (1, 2, 6, 7, 8, 10)
 Steve Rinkoff – recording (3, 5, 9), mixing (3, 5, 9)
 Jay Healy – recording (4), mixing (4)
 Joe Pirrera – recording (4), mixing (4)
 Bruce Calder – additional engineer (1, 2, 6, 7, 8, 10), assistant engineer (1, 2, 6, 7, 8, 10)
 Dan Gellert – assistant engineer (3, 5, 9)
 Bob Ludwig – mastering at Masterdisk (New York City, New York)
 Karen Fine – production coordinator (1, 2, 6, 7, 8, 10)
 Jill Dell'Abate – production coordinator (3, 5, 9)
 Alexandra Saraspe-Conomos – production assistant (3, 5, 9)
 Carol Bobolts – art direction 
 Michele Clement – photography 
 Chip Rachlin and CHR Management – management

References

Phoebe Snow albums
1989 albums
Elektra Records albums
Albums produced by Rob Fraboni
Albums produced by Ricky Fataar